Tracey Ullman is a British-American actress who has had an extensive career in television, film, and theatre. She has worked in both comedy and drama. Her sketch comedy television programmes have won her numerous awards in both the United States and the United Kingdom. She began her stage career in the mid-1970s starring in various West End musicals and dramas. Her first television appearance came in 1980 playing Lisa Mackenzie in the British drama series Mackenzie. In 1981, the BBC cast her in two ensemble comedy sketch shows; A Kick Up the Eighties, and Three of a Kind (which also featured Lenny Henry and David Copperfield). In 1983, Ullman launched a brief but successful pop singing career, garnering several chart hits and making several appearances on Top of the Pops. In 1985, she was cast in the ITV sitcom Girls on Top alongside Dawn French, Jennifer Saunders, and Ruby Wax.

She came to the attention of producer James L. Brooks after her critically acclaimed BAFTA nominated performance in the film drama, Plenty (1985). Brooks would go on to create and produce her first American television comedy programme, The Tracey Ullman Show in 1987. The show spun-off the longest-running American scripted primetime television series, The Simpsons in 1989. Her first big screen leading role came in 1990 in I Love You to Death. She would go on to star and appear in such films as Robin Hood: Men in Tights (1993), Nancy Savoca's Household Saints (1993), Bullets over Broadway (1994), and Small Time Crooks (2000).

In 1993, she returned to television with the comedy specials Tracey Ullman: A Class Act and Tracey Ullman Takes on New York for HBO in the United States. This led to a long career producing and starring in programmes created for American cable television. After a thirty-year absence she returned to the BBC creating the sketch comedy programme Tracey Ullman's Show in 2016. In 2020, she returned in the FX historical drama television miniseries Mrs. America playing Betty Friedan earning herself both critical praise and accolades.

Filmography

Television

Film

Theatre

Radio

See also
 List of awards and nominations received by Tracey Ullman

References

External links
 
 

Filmography
Actress filmographies
American filmographies
British filmographies